Leva Reka may refer to:
Leva Reka, Vranje, a village in Serbia
Leva Reka, Resen, a village in North Macedonia